Ranoidea rara is a species of frog in the subfamily Pelodryadinae, endemic to Indonesia.  Scientists have observed it in Papua Province, about 750 meters above sea level.

References

Frogs of Asia
Amphibians described in 2005
rara